Two Lives is a Spanish soap opera television series based on an original idea by Josep Cister Rubio that began airing on 25 January 2021 on La 1. It tells the story of two women in two different timelines: current-day Spain and 1950s colonial Spanish Guinea.

Premise 
The plot follows two women in two different timelines: Julia (a 30-year-old woman in current-day Spain who has inherited a house in the mountains from her father) and her grandmother Carmen, who lands in 1950s Equatorial Guinea, then a Spanish colony.

Cast

Production 
Shooting began in October 2020, taking place in between the Anaga Rural Park in Tenerife and the Madrid region. The fictional village of 'Robledillo de la Sierra' is portrayed by the actual municipalities of Chapinería and Colmenar del Arroyo.

Release 
Developed as replacement for Mercado Central in the early afternoon slot, the series began airing on 25 January 2021. TVE temporarily interrupted the airing of the series in August 2021 because of the broadcasting of the 2021 Vuelta a España. In October 2021, in the wake of the unimpressive viewership ratings, RTVE decided not to renew the series for a second season. This left the broadcasting of the series a margin until a presumed ending date by February 2022 to close the different subplots. The series finale was scheduled for 8 February 2022.

|-
| align="center" | 2021 || 60th Rose d'Or Entertainment Programming Awards || colspan="2" | Best Soap or Telenovela ||  || 
|-
| align = "center" | 2022 || 50th International Emmy Awards || colspan = "2" | Best Telenovela ||  || align = "center" | 
|}

References

External links 
 Dos vidas on RTVE Play

Television shows filmed in Spain
La 1 (Spanish TV channel) network series
Equatorial Guinea in fiction
Television shows set in Spain
2021 Spanish television series debuts
2022 Spanish television series endings
2020s Spanish drama television series
Spanish television soap operas
Spanish-language television shows
Television series about colonialism
Television series set in the 1950s
Television series set in the 2020s
Television series by Bambú Producciones